João de Sande Magalhães Mexia Ayres de Campos, 2nd Count of Ameal, ComC, CvNSC (Coimbra, 11 May 1877 – Ota, Alenquer, 22 December 1952) was a Portuguese politician and career diplomat, having served in this capacity in the Hague, and also as Secretary to Portugal's Minister of Foreign Affairs, Venceslau de Lima. He was as a key participant in the failed republican Municipal Library Elevator Coup of 1908, which targeted the Constitutional monarchy of King Charles I and what were perceived as the dictatorial powers of his then prime minister João Franco.

Early life and marriage 

João Ayres de Campos was born in Coimbra, the eldest son of João Maria Correia Ayres de Campos and his wife Maria Amélia de Sande Mexia Vieira da Mota, niece and sole heir of Carlos Pinto Vieira da Mota, 1st Count of Juncal. He was granted the courtesy title Viscount of Ameal (Portuguese: Visconde do Ameal) by Carlos I of Portugal in 1901, at the age of 23, upon his father's accession to the peerage as Count of Ameal. These titles were confirmed by king Manuel II in exile in 1920. He would succeed in the comital title at his father's death in 1920.

On 21 November 1901 he married Maria Benedita Falcão Barbosa de Azevedo e Bourbon, issued from a prominent Bragan family and sister of the 2nd Count of Azevedo.

Revolutionary politics and attempted coup 

 In 1905, João Ayres de Campos was part of the Dissidência Progressista, an influential left-wing breakaway from the Partido Progressista in the last years of Portugal's Liberal Monarchy, led by José Maria de Alpoim. The party was staunchly opposed to the conservative Partido Regenerador, to which his father had belonged throughout his political career, and Alpuim's wing had close ties with Afonso Costa's republican movement.

With several members of this group and in cooperation with Costa's Republican Party, João (then styled Viscount of Ameal) was involved in the failed Municipal Library Elevator Coup, one month before the Lisbon Regicide. Its organisers were opposed to the administrative dictatorship of Prime Minister João Franco, and to King Carlos I's perceived protection of Franco's Liberal Regeneration Party.

Unlike co-conspirators Afonso Costa, António Egas Moniz and the Viscount of Ribeira Brava, among others, Ameal avoided arrest, having managed to escape to Galicia disguised as a campino; a detailed plan for the intended coup was however found among his papers, testifying to his prominence in the plot. In a later interview to the Spanish periodical La Voz de Galicia, he reminisced about his involvement in the attempted revolution, acknowledging that he had hosted the conspirators in his property and given them a key to the premises of the elevator. He did not, however, elaborate on the extent of his participation in the tentative coup d'etat.

Later life 

Ameal remained in Spain after the dismantlement of the Elevador conspiracy, and only resumed his political career upon the proclamation of the Portuguese Republic on 5 October 1910. His later public life was developed under the auspices of the First Portuguese Republic. However, he eventually became disillusioned with the new regime's instability, and by the early 1930s he welcomed the dawn of Salazar's authoritarian Estado Novo  – of which his son João Francisco de Barbosa Azevedo de Sande Ayres de Campos, later 3rd Count of Ameal, was one of the leading ideologues.

He was killed alongside his wife in a car accident in Ota, near Lisbon, in 1952., and is buried in the monumental Gothic Revival mausoleum of the Counts of Ameal in Coimbra's Conchada cemetery.

He was succeeded in his titles by his only son, a prolific author and a committed monarchist.

References

See also 

 Municipal Library Elevator Coup
 Progressive Dissidence
 José Maria de Alpoim
 João Maria Correia Ayres de Campos, 1st Count of Ameal
 João Ameal

1877 births
1952 deaths
People from Coimbra
Portuguese diplomats
Progressive Party (Portugal) politicians
Portuguese revolutionaries
University of Coimbra alumni